Vallisneria americana, commonly called wild celery, water-celery, tape grass, or  eelgrass,  is a plant in the family Hydrocharitaceae, the "tape-grasses". V. americana is a fresh water species that can tolerate salt, living in salinities  varying from fresh water (0 parts per thousand) to 18 parts per thousand, although the limit to the salt tolerance is unclear, and is generally dependent on the duration and intensity of the plants’ exposure to the saline water. V. americana is a deep rooted plant with leaves, approximately one inch wide, with the ability to rise two or more meters above the clustered base of the plant. Contrary to the implications of one of its common names, wild celery bears little to no resemblance to the celery used as a vegetable. V. americana grows under water and is consumed by various animals, including the canvasback. The plants themselves are long, limp, flat, and have a green mid-ridge.

Despite its name, it is not restricted to the Americas. It occurs naturally in Iraq, China, Japan, Korea, India, Papua New Guinea, the Philippines, Australia, Canada, the United States, Mexico, Guatemala, Honduras, Cuba, the Dominican Republic, Haiti and Venezuela.  It is found primarily in eastern North America, occurring west from Nova Scotia to South Dakota and South to the Gulf of Mexico. It has also been reported in the western states of Washington, Nebraska, New Mexico and Arizona.

V. americana is cultivated for the aquarium trade, where it is a sold as a background plant.

Habitat and importance
Like many seagrass ecosystems, V. americana beds provide a rich abundance of prey as food for other species, and is a refuge for many species, including commercial, recreational, endangered and invasive organisms, and also acts as a nursery for fishery species. Beds of V. americana, especially in Louisiana, have been known to be homes to many crustacean, gastropods, invertebrates and fish, and have been known to be grazed on by West Indian Manatees. The beds of V. americana are great at stabilizing sediment and shorelines, facilitating detrital food webs, and improving water quality by filtering the surrounding water.

Factors for growth
The salinity tolerance of V. americana has been up to debate, and has been topic of many scientific research and experiments. It has been suggested that the difference between the collected data sets is due to the varying duration of the experiments and the different methodology used in each experiment. The highest tolerance range is generally noted to be anywhere from ten parts per thousand to twenty parts per thousand. Many experiments have shown that the general trend of growth is that as the salinity of the water goes up, the growth of the plant decreases, but the roots of the plants are known to show greater tolerance to salinity than the shoots do.

Reproduction
V. americana generally maintains its population by clonal reproduction through the use of runners, but they are also capable of reproducing through the use of seeds. Salinity seems to affect the germination process in the same way it does the growth of the plant.

References

External links

Maryland DNR's Bay Grass ID Key: Wild celery
Minnesota DNR Aquatic plant information: Wild celery
USGS NPWRC report: American Wildcelery (Vallisneria americana) -- Ecological Considerations for Restoration
Flora boreali-Americana 2:220. 1803

Hydrocharitaceae
Freshwater plants
Flora of North America
Flora of South America
Flora of Asia
Aquarium plants
Taxa named by André Michaux
Flora without expected TNC conservation status